The World Fantasy Awards are given each year by the World Fantasy Convention for the best fantasy fiction published in English during the previous calendar year. The awards have been described by book critics such as The Guardian as a "prestigious fantasy prize", and one of the three most prestigious speculative fiction awards, along with the Hugo and Nebula Awards (which cover both fantasy and science fiction). The World Fantasy Convention Award is a special award given in some years for "peerless contributions to the fantasy genre". These have included authors, editors, and publishers. Other, annually-presented special awards are given out for professional or non-professional work in the prior year in the Special Award—Professional and Special Award—Non-professional categories. A Life Achievement award is also given annually. The World Fantasy Convention Award was first presented in 1978; it was awarded annually through 1987 and again in 1997 and 2013. It has not been awarded since, though it is still listed as an official category.

Most World Fantasy Award nominees and winners are decided by attendees and judges of the annual World Fantasy Convention. A ballot is posted in June for attendees of the current and previous two conferences to determine two of the finalists, and a panel of five judges adds three or more nominees before voting on the overall winner. The panel of judges is typically made up of fantasy authors and is chosen each year by the World Fantasy Awards Administration, which has the power to break ties. Unlike the other World Fantasy Award categories, the Convention Award has no nominees and is not decided in the usual way; instead, the winner is selected by the convention organizers themselves and announced along with the nominees in the other categories. The final results are presented at the World Fantasy Convention at the end of October. Through 2015, winners were presented with a statuette of H. P. Lovecraft; more recent winners receive a statuette of a tree.

Thirteen people and one publishing house have been given the Convention Award. Seven of the winners are primarily known for their writing, as opposed to editing work or artwork. Six of the winners have gone on to be awarded the Lifetime Achievement award, sometimes only a few years after they were given a Convention Award: Evangeline Walton four years later in 1989, Andre Norton eleven years later in 1998, Hugh B. Cave two years later in 1999, Donald M. Grant nineteen years later in 2003, and Stephen King and Gahan Wilson, twenty-four and twenty-three years later in 2004.

Winners
In the following table, the years correspond to the date of the ceremony. Items in the Work(s) column are items and companies that the winner created or worked at; they are meant to be representative of the winner's career in the field of fantasy to that point, but the World Fantasy Convention Award is not given for any specific achievement, and no such achievements are listed by the World Fantasy Convention as reasons for the award. In some cases the winner is well known for their non-fantasy works, such as science fiction novels, which are not listed.

References

External links
 World Fantasy Convention official site
 World Fantasy Awards, complete list of all winning and nominated works

Convention Award